Hojjatabad (also Romanized as Ḩojjatābād; also known as Kalāteh-ye Shūr) is a village in Robat-e Jaz Rural District, in the Central District of Khoshab County, Razavi Khorasan Province, Iran. At the 2006 census, its population was 95, in 25 families.

References 

Populated places in Khoshab County